Priuralye is a rural locality (a village) in Tavakachevsky Selsoviet, Arkhangelsky District, Bashkortostan, Russia. The population was 373 as of 2010. There are 4 streets.

Geography 
Priuralye is located 6 km north of Arkhangelskoye (the district's administrative centre) by road. Tavakachevo is the nearest rural locality.

References 

Rural localities in Arkhangelsky District